Steven Robert Biegler (born March 22, 1959) is an American prelate of the Roman Catholic Church who has been serving as bishop for the Diocese of Cheyenne in Wyoming since 2017.

Biography

Early life 
Steven Biegler was born on March 22, 1959, in Mobridge, South Dakota.  He is one of 13 children of Alfred and Mary Biegler. He attended Timber Lake High School in Timber Lake, South Dakota,  then entered South Dakota School of Mines and Technology (SDSM&T) in Rapid City, South Dakota.  After one year in college, Biegler went to work on the family farm for the next eight years. He then spent time in a construction crew filling in abandoned coal mines around Glenrock, Wyoming.

By 1986, Biegler had decided to enter the priesthood. He went into Immaculate Heart of Mary Seminary and started course work at Saint Mary's University of Minnesota, both in Winona, Minnesota.  Biegler graduated in 1989 with a bachelor's degree in philosophy. After finishing at St. Mary's, he entered the Pontifical North American College in Rome while studying at the Pontifical Gregorian University. He received an Bachelor of Sacred Theology degree in 1993 from the Gregorian.

Priesthood 
Biegler was ordained to the priesthood for Diocese of Rapid City on July 9, 1993, by Archbishop Charles Chaput at Holy Cross Church in Timber Lake.  After his ordination, Biegler had numerous pastoral assignments in South Dakota parishes:

 Associate pastor of Our Lady of Perpetual Help Cathedral Parish in Rapid City from 1993 to 1994
 Administrator for three parishes:  Immaculate Conception in Bonesteel, St. Anthony’s in Fairfax, and St. Francis Xavier in Ponca Creek, from 1996 to 2003 
 Co-pastor at St. Bernard in McLaughlin and St. Bonaventure in McIntosh from 2001 to 2003 
 Pastoral assignments at St. Aloysius in Bullhead, Assumption of the BVM in Kenel, St. Bede in Wakpala and St. Michael in Watauga from 2001 to 2003
In addition to his pastoral assignments, Biegler served on the college of consultors and the, presbyteral council for the diocese. In 2003, Biegler was appointed director of apostolic and pastoral formation at the North American College in Rome, serving there until 2006.  He remained in Rome until 2007, working as the assistant to the rector of the Casa Santa Maria, a residence for priests at the college. Biegler returned to Rapid City in 2007 to assume several posts:

 Chaplain for the Rapid City Catholic Schools 
 Chaplain for the Newman Center at SDSM&T 
 Pastoral position at St. Michael Parish in Hermosa, South Dakota

In 2009, Biegler resumed his work on the college of consultors and the, presbyteral council.  He gave up his chaplain and pastoral assignments in 2010 to serve for one year as diocesan administrator after the departure of Bishop Blase J. Cupich.  With the installation of a new bishop, Biegler was appointed pastor of Our Lady of the Black Hills Parish in Piedmont, South Dakota.  He was named vicar general for the diocese in 2013. He was moved from Our Lady in 2015 to become pastor of Cathedral of Our Lady of Perpetual Help Parish and of St. Michael Parish.

Bishop of Cheyenne 
Pope Francis appointed Biegler to be the ninth bishop of the Diocese of Cheyenne on March 16, 2017.  On June 5, 2017, Biegler was consecrated during an installation mass with Archbishop Samuel J. Aquila as consecrator.  Biegler is a member of the Jesus Caritas, a fraternal organization for priests.

In 2019, Biegler announced that Bishop Emeritus Joseph Hart, a former bishop of Cheyenne, was being investigated by the Congregation for the Doctrine of the Faith at the Vatican for allegations of sexual abuse of minors.  Hart denied all the accusations.  In 2021, the Congregation exonerated Hart of several charges and said it had insufficient evidence to prove several others.  It reprimanded Hart for bad decision making. Local prosecutors declined to indict Hart on any crimes.  After the Congregation's decision, Biegler stated that he believed the victims.

In the 2019 Fall meeting of the U.S. Conference of Catholic Bishops (USCCB), Biegler said that priests need to refocus their efforts on being pastors to rebuild trust in the church in the wake of the sexual abuse scandals,

See also

 Catholic Church hierarchy
 Catholic Church in the United States
 Historical list of the Catholic bishops of the United States
 List of Catholic bishops of the United States
 Lists of patriarchs, archbishops, and bishops

References

External links

 Roman Catholic Diocese of  Cheyenne Official Site 

 

1959 births
Living people
People from Mobridge, South Dakota
Roman Catholic Diocese of Cheyenne
Roman Catholic Diocese of Rapid City
Catholics from South Dakota
21st-century Roman Catholic bishops in the United States
Bishops appointed by Pope Francis